Opération Persil was a 1959 covert operation by the French government aimed at destabilising the post-independence government of Guinea due to Guinean president Ahmed Sékou Touré's rejection of the CFA franc and his successful campaign for Guinean independence.

Background 
In September 1958, a constitutional referendum was held in Guinea, then still a French-colony, which, if passed, French colonies would become part of the new French Community and if rejected, the territory would be granted independence. During the referendum campaign, French President Charles de Gaulle visited Guinea, but was met with a lukewarm reaction. Guinea was one of only two colonies where the major political party campaigned for a "no" vote. The country then became the only one to reject the offer and opt for immediate independence. On 2 October 1958, Guinea became an independent country under president Ahmed Sékou Touré.

Despite having declared during the referendum campaign that "Guinea prefers poverty in freedom to riches in slavery," which was seen as a great insult in France, Touré initially attempted to maintain relations with France, stating a desire to remain in the franc zone and assuring businesses in Guinea of continued international openness to Guinea's significant mineral, agriculture, and hydro-electric resources. However, relations between the newly independent Guinea and France almost immediately became strained. French colonialists in Guinea withdrew from the country as quickly as they could, destroying as much infrastructure as they could in retribution. The Washington Post reported that "as a warning to other French-speaking territories, the French pulled out of Guinea over a two-month period, taking everything they could with them. They unscrewed light bulbs, removed plans for sewage pipelines in Conakry, the capital, and even burned medicines rather than leave them for the Guineans." The French government additionally stopped paying the pensions of Guinean soldiers who had fought for France in World War 2 and attempted to block Guinea's accession to the United Nations.

Opération Persil 
In early 1960, after attempts to repair French-Guinea relations continued to be met with failure, especially on the issue of currency, the Guinean government created its own central bank and launched an independent currency, the Guinean Franc, pulling Guinea out of the French franc area.

In response, Jacques Foccart, Charles de Gaulle's chief adviser for African matters and co-founder of the Service d'Action Civique militia, drew up covert plans to destabilise Touré's government, naming it Opération Persil after the popular detergent brand Persil (whose advertising boasted of its ability to wash away dirt). The operation would base itself on two components: causing economic collapse and causing armed insurgencies against the Guinean government.

The operation provided for the Service de Documentation Extérieure et de Contre-Espionnage (SDECE), based in Senegal, to create large quantities of forged Guinean francs to flood the country with and bring about hyperinflation and economic collapse, similar to the Nazi Operation Bernhard. AS the French-produced banknotes proved to be more resistant to the humid Guinean climate than the official banknotes produced in Czechoslovakia, the French government was able to cause significant economic instability.

The SDECE was also to arm opposition figures in Guinea and organise them into paramilitaries that would lead to civil war and the ultimate overthrow of Touré's government. However, the operation suffered a number of leaks and soon the Guinean was issuing a number of official complaints. Those complaints were initially ignored by the French government. However, on 10 May 1960, the Senegalese police seized a large weapons shipment headed for Guinea - a weapons shipment that had been organised by the French government under Opération Persil. The Senegalese government, headed by Prime Minister Mamadou Dia and who had achieved independence from France a month earlier, launched an official investigation into the affair and sent an official complaint to the French government. This time, news of the complaints found more widespread attention in France, and the ensuing diplomatic embarrassment caused the French government to abandon the operation.

The ultimate failure of the operation to overthrow the Guinean government proved a boost for Touré's dictatorial tendencies, who used it as an excuse to clamp down on opposition in Guinea and to spread propaganda of secret conspiracies aiming to undermine Guinea's independence. The operation also severely affected already-strained relations between France and Guinea - from 1965 to 1975 Touré ended all his government's relations with France, the former colonial power.

References 

1959 in Guinea
1959 in France
French colonisation in Africa
Colonialism